Foxhall Parker may refer to:

 Foxhall A. Parker Sr. (1788-1857), United States Navy officer who fought in the War of 1812, father of Foxhall A. Parker, Jr.
 Foxhall A. Parker Jr. (1821-1879), United States Navy officer who fought in the American Civil War, son of Foxhall A. Parker, Sr.